The name Gene has been used two times in the Western Pacific:
Typhoon Gene (1990) (9021, 22W) - hit Japan
Tropical Storm Gene (1993) (9323, 30W, Dinang) - did not affect land

The name Gene has been used two times in the South Pacific:
Cyclone Gene (1992) - no threat to land
Cyclone Gene (2008) - caused extensive practice to Fiji and Vanuatu

Pacific typhoon set index articles
South Pacific cyclone set index articles